Lavandulol is a monoterpene alcohol found in a variety of essential oils such as lavender oil.  The term refers to either of two enantiomers.  The (R)-enantiomer is natural and has an aroma described as "weak floral, herbal odor with slightly lemon-like, fresh citrus fruity nuance"; the (S)-enantiomer has only a weak odor.

Lavandulol and its esters are used in the perfume industry and have been identified as insect pheromones.

See also
 Lavandulyl acetate

References

External links
 

Monoterpenes
Primary alcohols